Massagris contortuplicata is a jumping spider species in the genus Massagris that lives in South Africa. The female was first identified in 2013.

References

Salticidae
Spiders of South Africa
Spiders described in 2013
Taxa named by Wanda Wesołowska